Tera Mera Ki Rishta is a 2009 Indian Punjabi language romantic drama film directed by Navaniat Singh and produced by Mukesh Sharma. The film stars Jimmy Sheirgill and Kulraj Randhawa in lead roles along with Anupam Kher, Raj Babbar, Archana Puran Singh, Gurpreet Ghuggi, Binnu Dhillon, Rana Ranbir, Balkaran Brar, Tee Jay Sidhu, Dolly Minhas and Akshita in supporting roles. The Movie was released worldwide on 10 April 2009 and had earned $108,741 in first two weeks. The movie was shot by Spice Cine Vision Studios and was distributed by Eros International. The movie was stated to be the costliest Punjabi movie ever made and was the first Punjabi movie to be shot in Switzerland. Tera Mera Ki Rishta was also the first Punjabi Movie to be promoted online by www.punjabiportal.com and an official movie launch center website was also introduced. The movie is a remake of the 2005 Telugu movie Nuvvostanante Nenoddantana.

Plot 
Meet (Jimmy Sheirgill), a Punjabi boy who lives in Vancouver, British Columbia, Canada, is a total fun loving chap. Adventure is his second name. High speed bikes, racing cars, ice hockey and what not, you name any adventure and Meet is there to rock. He is an adventurous brat of a highly sophisticated Canadian family. Rajjo (Kulraj Randhawa) is a girl of principles from Punjab. She has family values & cultural priorities very close to her heart. Come what may, she will never act in a way that will embarrass her family. What happens when Meet and Rajjo, from entirely different worlds, come together, and fall in love!! As everything was going in a merry way, the tale takes a sudden turn. Before they could realise, fate has parted their way, but destiny has something else in store. Meet is not ready to surrender in front of his fate. He will not let his love slip away in front of his eyes. In this topsy turvy tale of love, family & relationships, they just can't help asking each other, Tera Mera Ki Rishta?

Cast 
Jimmy Sheirgill as Meet
Kulraj Randhawa as Rajjo
Anupam Kher as Meet's Father Mohinder
Raj Babbar as Kabir
Archana Puran Singh as Meet's Mother Natasha
Gurpreet Ghuggi
 Akshita Vasudeva
Rana Ranbir
Binnu Dhillon as Shingara
Balkaran Brar
Teejay Sidhu as Honey
Dolly Minhas

Soundtrack 

The soundtrack album of Tera Mera Ki Rishta consists of 8 songs composed by Jaidev Kumar, the lyrics of which were written by Irshad Kamil and Jaggi Singh.

References

External links 
Official Website

2009 films
Punjabi-language Indian films
Punjabi remakes of Telugu films
Films scored by Jaidev Kumar
2000s Punjabi-language films